The 1983 British League season was the 49th season of the top tier of speedway in the United Kingdom and the 19th known as the British League.

Summary
Cradley Heath Heathens won the league and cup double. Despite losing their double world champion Bruce Penhall to retirement the Cradley side performed just as well. Erik Gundersen, Simon Wigg and Lance King were now some of the world's leading riders and backed up by Phil Collins, Alan Grahame and Peter Ravn they were a formidable team. Even Penhall's replacement, a new signing from Denmark Jan O. Pedersen was already showing signs of a bright future.

Final table
M = Matches; W = Wins; D = Draws; L = Losses; Pts = Total Points

British League Knockout Cup
The 1983 Speedway Star British League Knockout Cup was the 45th edition of the Knockout Cup for tier one teams. Cradley Heath Heathens were the winners.

First round

Quarter-finals

Semi-finals

Final

First leg=

Second leg

Cradley Heath were declared Knockout Cup Champions, winning on aggregate 86-70.

League Cup
The League Cup was split into North and South sections. The two-legged final was won by Belle Vue Aces beating Coventry Bees in the final 86-70 on aggregate.

South Group

North Group

Final

Leading final averages

Riders & final averages
Belle Vue

 10.30
 9.13
 7.37
 5.62
 5.38
 4.95
 4.48
 4.30
 1.09

Birmingham

 10.82 
 8.29 
 6.88
 5.71
 5.63
 5.36
 5.01
 4.85
 3.13
 2.07

Coventry

 9.87
 9.56
 8.07
 6.79
 5.44
 5.23
 4.87

Cradley Heath

 10.23   
 8.86
 8.74
 8.69
 7.98 
 7.97
 6.78
 6.00
 2.54

Eastbourne

 8.73
 6.53
 4.18
 3.87
 3.79
 3.79
 3.75
 3.65
 3.56
 2.55
 1.93
 0.27

Hackney

 8.47
 7.94
 6.74
 6.30
 6.25
 4.83
 4.39
 4.30

Halifax

 10.28 
 6.60 
 6.17
 5.77
 5.59
 5.41
 3.52
 2.40

Ipswich

 10.75
 9.70
 6.79
 6.72
 4.82
 4.51
 4.08
 4.06
 0.35

King's Lynn

 8.45
 8.39
 7.02
 6.29
 6.21
 5.95
 5.25

Leicester

 8.66
 8.24
 7.17 
 5.95
 5.11
 5.10
 4.98
 4.76
 3.85
 3.81

Poole

 10.16
 7.72
 6.95
 6.06
 5.38
 4.74
 4.41
 4.23
 3.56
 2.96

Reading

 10.02 
 9.47
 9.02
 7.28
 4.31
 3.85
 3.24
 2.74

Sheffield

 9.43 
 7.03
 6.26
 5.84
 5.09
 3.97
 3.26
 2.13

Swindon

 10.03
 7.01
 5.65
 5.23
 5.14
 4.99
 4.31
 3.57
 2.88
 1.93

Wimbledon

 9.25
 7.86
 7.67
 6.55
 6.19
 5.95
 5.18

See also
List of United Kingdom Speedway League Champions
Knockout Cup (speedway)

References

British League
1983 in British motorsport
1983 in speedway